Bettiah (Lok Sabha constituency) was a Lok Sabha constituency in Bihar.

Members of Parliament

See also
 Bettiah
 List of Constituencies of the Lok Sabha

Politics of West Champaran district
Former Lok Sabha constituencies of Bihar
Former constituencies of the Lok Sabha
2008 disestablishments in India
Constituencies disestablished in 2008